Mia Caroline Risa Gomez (born 21 December 2005) is a Norwegian figure skater. She is the 2022 Open d'Andorra, 2022 Santa Claus Cup, and 2023 Norwegian national champion. She has represented Norway at two ISU Championships, reaching the final segment at the 2023 European Championships.

Personal life 
Mia Caroline Risa Gomez was born in Mexico City, to a Mexican mother and a Norwegian father. The family moved to Norway when she was two years old.

Career

Early years 
Risa Gomez began learning to skate in 2012. She competed in the advanced novice category in the 2018–19 season and moved up to the junior ranks the following season. She made her ISU Junior Grand Prix (JGP) debut in September 2019, in Latvia. She had no international appearances in the 2020–21 season, which was affected by the COVID-19 pandemic.

In the 2021–22 season, Risa Gomez returned to the JGP series and also competed at the 2022 World Junior Championships, placing 37th in the short program.

2022–23 season 
Risa Gomez began her season on the JGP series, before switching to the senior ranks. Competing in seniors, she won silver at the Denkova-Staviski Cup in Bulgaria, gold at the Open d'Andorra, and gold at the Santa Claus Cup in Hungary. By December, she attained the minimum technical score required to compete at senior Worlds and was officially nominated to represent Norway at the European Championships.

In January, Risa Gomez won the Norwegian national title and then competed at the 2023 European Championships in Helsinki. She qualified to the free skate and finished 22nd overall.

Programs

Competitive highlights 
GP: Grand Prix; CS: Challenger Series; JGP: Junior Grand Prix

References

External links 
 
 

2005 births
Living people
Norwegian female single skaters
Norwegian people of Mexican descent
Sportspeople from Mexico City
Sportspeople from Stavanger